Lillipilli or Lilly Pilly may refer to:

 Lilli Pilli, New South Wales, a small suburb in southern Sydney, Australia
 Any of several genera of plants commonly known as lillipilli, including:
 Syzygium, water apples, rose apples
 Waterhousea, weeping lilly pilly